Angel Child may refer to:

Angel Child (film), 1918
"Angel Child" (traditional song) recorded by Memphis Slim (1948) and others
"Angel Child" (Oasis song)